Catocala verrilliana, or Verrill's underwing, is a moth of the family Erebidae. The species was first described by Augustus Radcliffe Grote in 1875. It is found in the US from Washington and Oregon to Colorado and south to California, Arizona and Texas, and Cimarron County in western Oklahoma.

The wingspan is 45–60 mm. Adults are on wing from May to September depending on the location. There is probably one generation per year.

The larvae feed on Quercus macrocarpa, Quercus alba and Quercus garryana.

Subspecies
Catocala verrilliana beutenmulleri, recorded from Utah, is now considered a synonym.

References

External links
Oehlke, Bill. "Catocala verrilliana Grote, 1875". The Catocala Website. Archived August 21, 2010.

verrilliana
Moths of North America
Moths described in 1875